SPA are a British band comprising Simon Toulson-Clarke, Phill Brown and Alastair Gavin. Toulson-Clarke and Gavin had previously worked together on the Red Box album Motive.

SPA is an acronym of the names of its members - Simon, Phill and Alastair.

They released their self-titled debut album, SPA, in 1997.

Discography

Studio albums
SPA (1997), Northern Sky Music

References

English pop music groups
British musical trios